Henrique Ribeiro Pires (born 8 April 2002) is a Portuguese professional footballer who plays as a centre-back for the Under-23 squad of Estoril.

Club career
A youth product of Sporting CP, Barreirense, Amora and Belenenses, Pires began his senior career with the reserves of Belenenses SAD in 2020. He was called to the senior team after a COVID-19 outbreak hit the squad. One of only 9 starters in the squad for the match, he made his professional debut with B-SAD in a 7–0 Primeira Liga loss to Benfica on 24 July 2021 that ended up being called off.

References

External links

2002 births
Living people
Portuguese footballers
Association football defenders
Belenenses SAD players
Primeira Liga players
Campeonato de Portugal (league) players